Vaabina is a village in Antsla Parish, Võru County, in southeastern Estonia, located about 6 km northeast of the town of Antsla. It has a population of 232 (as of 26 May 2004).

Vaabina has a station on currently inactive Valga–Pechory railway. It is the birthplace of Emma Asson (1889–1965), who was the first women to be elected to the Estonian parliament.

Vaabina Manor
Its present name Vaabina is derived from the first name of Fabian von Tiesenhausen, the owner of the Ülzen manor in the 16th century. Nowadays there's no remains left of the previous knight manor.

References

Villages in Võru County
Kreis Werro